WinView may refer to:

Citrix WinView, a remote-access product based on Novell's NetWare Access Server by Citrix in the 1990s
WinView (company), a company founded by David Lockton in 2009